The 2022 Vancouver Whitecaps FC season is the club's twelfth season in Major League Soccer, the top division of soccer in the United States and Canada. Including previous iterations of the franchise, this was the 45th season of professional soccer being played in Vancouver under a variation of the "Whitecaps" name.

On November 30, 2021, Vanni Sartini was named the permanent manager after taking over as the acting manager during the 2021 season.

Current roster

Transfers

In

Transferred in

Loans In

Out

Transferred out

Loans out

Preseason

Major League Soccer

Regular season

League tables

Western Conference

Overall

Results

Matches

Canadian Championship

Statistics

Appearances and goals

|-
! colspan="14" style=background:#dcdcdc; text-align:center| Goalkeepers

 

|-
! colspan="14" style=background:#dcdcdc; text-align:center| Defenders

|-
! colspan="14" style=background:#dcdcdc; text-align:center| Midfielders

|-
! colspan="14" style=background:#dcdcdc; text-align:center| Forwards

|-
! colspan="14" style=background:#dcdcdc; text-align:center| Players transferred out during the season

Goalscorers

Clean sheets

Disciplinary record

References

2022 in British Columbia
2022 Major League Soccer season
2022
Canadian soccer clubs 2022 season